In field theory, a branch of mathematics, the minimal polynomial of an element  of a field extension is, roughly speaking, the polynomial of lowest degree having coefficients in the field, such that  is a root of the polynomial. If the minimal polynomial of  exists, it is unique. The coefficient of the highest-degree term in the polynomial is required to be 1.

More formally, a minimal polynomial is defined relative to a field extension  and an element of the extension field . The element  is called a root or zero of each polynomial in 

More specifically, Jα is the kernel of the ring homomorphism from F[x] to E which sends polynomials g to their value g(α) at the element α. Because it is the kernel of a ring homomorphism, Jα is an ideal of the polynomial ring F[x]: it is closed under polynomial addition and subtraction (hence containing the zero polynomial), as well as under multiplication by elements of F (which is scalar multiplication if F[x] is regarded as a vector space over F).

This makes the zero polynomial useless for classifying different values of  into types, so it is excepted.

Minimal polynomials are useful for constructing and analyzing field extensions. Minimal polynomials are also used to define conjugate elements.

Definition 

Let E/F be a field extension, α an element of E, and F[x] the ring of polynomials in x over F. The element α has a minimal polynomial when α is algebraic over F, that is, when f(α) = 0 for some non-zero polynomial f(x) in F[x]. Then the minimal polynomial of α is defined as the monic polynomial of least degree among all polynomials in F[x] having α as a root.

Properties 

Throughout this section, let E/F be a field extension over F as above, let α ∈ E be an algebraic element over F and let Jα be the ideal of polynomials vanishing on α.

Uniqueness 

The minimal polynomial f of α is unique.

To prove this, suppose that f and g are monic polynomials in Jα of minimal degree n > 0. We have that r := f−g ∈ Jα (because the latter is closed under addition/subtraction) and that m :=  deg(r) < n (because the polynomials are monic of the same degree). If r is not zero, then r / cm (writing cm ∈ F for the non-zero coefficient of highest degree in r) is a monic polynomial of degree m < n such that r / cm ∈ Jα (because the latter is closed under multiplication/division by non-zero elements of F), which contradicts our original assumption of minimality for n. We conclude that 0 = r = f − g, i.e. that f = g.

Irreducibility 

The minimal polynomial f of α is irreducible, i.e. it cannot be factorized as f = gh for two polynomials g and h of strictly lower degree.

To prove this, first observe that any factorization f = gh implies that either g(α) = 0 or h(α) = 0, because f(α) = 0 and F is a field (hence also an integral domain). Choosing both g and h to be of degree strictly lower than f would then contradict the minimality requirement on f, so f must be irreducible.

Minimal polynomial generates Jα 

The minimal polynomial f of α generates the ideal Jα, i.e. every  g in Jα can be factorized as g=fh for some h'  in F[x].

To prove this, it suffices to observe that F[x] is a principal ideal domain, because F is a field: this means that every ideal I in F[x], Jα amongst them, is generated by a single element f. With the exception of the zero ideal I = {0}, the generator f must be non-zero and it must be the unique polynomial of minimal degree, up to a factor in F (because the degree of fg is strictly larger than that of f whenever g is of degree greater than zero). In particular, there is a unique monic generator f, and all generators must be irreducible. When I is chosen to be Jα, for α algebraic over F, then the monic generator f is the minimal polynomial of α.

Examples

Minimal polynomial of a Galois field extension 
Given a Galois field extension  the minimal polynomial of any  not in  can be computed asif  has no stabilizers in the Galois action.

Quadratic field extensions

Q() 
If F = Q, E = R, α = , then the minimal polynomial for α is a(x) = x2 − 2. The base field F is important as it determines the possibilities for the coefficients of a(x).  For instance, if we take F = R, then the minimal polynomial for α =  is a(x) = x − .

Q() 
In general, for the quadratic extension given by a square-free , computing the minimal polynomial of an element  can be found using Galois theory. This can be used to determine  through a series of relations using modular arithmetic.

Biquadratic field extensions 
If  α =  + , then the minimal polynomial in Q[x] is a(x) = x4 − 10x2 + 1 = (x −  −  )(x +  − )(x −  + )(x +  + ).

Notice if  then the Galois action on  stabilizes . Hence the minimal polynomial can be found using the quotient group .

Roots of unity 
The minimal polynomials in Q[x] of roots of unity are the cyclotomic polynomials.

Swinnerton-Dyer polynomials 
The minimal polynomial in Q[x] of the sum of the square roots of the first n prime numbers is constructed analogously, and is called a Swinnerton-Dyer polynomial.

See also 

 Ring of integers
 Algebraic number field
 Minimal polynomials of

References 

 
 
 Pinter, Charles C. A Book of Abstract Algebra. Dover Books on Mathematics Series. Dover Publications, 2010, p. 270–273. 

Polynomials
Field (mathematics)